Egor Valeryevich Averin (born August 25, 1989) is a Russian professional ice hockey forward who currently plays for Lokomotiv Yaroslavl of the Kontinental Hockey League (KHL).

References

External links

1989 births
Avangard Omsk players
Living people
Lokomotiv Yaroslavl players
Russian ice hockey forwards
Sportspeople from Omsk